Catania (Sicilian and ) is the second largest municipality in Sicily, after Palermo. Despite its reputation as the second city of the island, Catania is the largest Sicilian conurbation, among the largest in Italy, as evidenced also by the presence of important road and rail transport infrastructures as well as by the main airport in Sicily, fifth in Italy. It is located on Sicily's east coast, at the base of the active volcano, Mount Etna, and it faces the Ionian Sea. It is the capital of the 58-municipality region known as the Metropolitan City of Catania, which is the seventh-largest metropolitan city in Italy. The population of the city proper is 311,584, while the population of the Metropolitan City of Catania is 1,107,702.

Catania was founded in the 8th century BC by Chalcidian Greeks. The city has weathered multiple geologic catastrophes: it was almost completely destroyed by a catastrophic earthquake in 1169. A major eruption and lava flow from nearby Mount Etna nearly swamped the city in 1669 and it suffered severe devastation from the 1693 Sicily earthquake.

During the 14th century, and into the Renaissance period, Catania was one of Italy's most important cultural, artistic and political centres. It was the site of Sicily's first university, founded in 1434. It has been the native or adopted home of some of Italy's most famous artists and writers, including the composers Vincenzo Bellini and Giovanni Pacini, and the writers Giovanni Verga, Luigi Capuana, Federico De Roberto and Nino Martoglio.

Catania today is the industrial, logistical, and commercial center of Sicily. Its airport, the Catania-Fontanarossa Airport, is the largest in Southern Italy. The central "old town" of Catania features exuberant late-baroque architecture, prompted after the 1693 earthquake, and is a UNESCO World Heritage Site.

Etymology
The ancient indigenous population of the Sicels named their villages after geographical attributes of their location. The Sicilian word, katane, means "grater, flaying knife, skinning place" or a "crude tool apt to pare". Other translations of the name are "harsh lands", "uneven ground", "sharp stones", or "rugged or rough soil". The latter etymologies are easily justifiable since, for many centuries following an eruption, the city has always been rebuilt within its black-lava landscape.

Around 263 BC, the city was variously known as Catĭna and Catăna. The former has been primarily used for its supposed assonance with catina, the Latin feminization of the name catinus. Catinus has two meanings: "a gulf, a basin or a bay" and "a bowl, a vessel or a trough", thanks to the city's distinctive topography.

Around 900, when Catania was part of the emirate of Sicily, it was known in Arabic as Balad al-fīl and Madīnat al-fīl, respectively meaning "the Village (or Country) of the Elephant" and "the City of the Elephant". The Elephant likely referred to the ancient lava sculpture, now placed over the fountain in Piazza Duomo. The sculpture is most likely a prehistoric sculpture that was reforged during the Byzantine Era, prized as a protective talisman against enemies, both human, natural or geologic. Another Arab toponym was Qaṭāniyyah, allegedly from the Arabic word for the "leguminous plants". Pulses like lentils, beans, peas, broad beans, and lupins were chiefly cultivated in the plains around the city well before the arrival of Aghlabids. Afterwards, many Arabic agronomists developed these crops and the citrus orchards in the area around the city. The toponym Wādī Mūsá, or "the Valley of Moses" (from the Arabic name of the Simeto River), was rarely used.

Geography
As observed by Strabo, the location of Catania at the foot of Mount Etna has been both a curse and a blessing. On the one hand, violent outbursts of the volcano throughout history have destroyed large parts of the city, while on the other hand the volcanic ashes yield fertile soil, especially suited for the growth of vines. (Strab. vi. p. 269)

Two subterranean rivers run under the city; the Amenano, which surfaces at one single point south of Piazza Duomo, and the Longane (or Lognina).

Climate
The Köppen Climate Classification subtype for this climate is "Csa" (Mediterranean Climate). It has hot summers, one of the hottest in the whole country of Italy (a feature characterising nearly every month).

Winters are mild with chilly nights (not rare peaks around ) . Most of precipitation is concentrated from October to March, leaving late spring and summer virtually dry (some years there is no rain for 3–4 months).

During winter nights lows can occasionally go under . Highs under  may happen during winter. Snow, due to the presence of Etna that protects the city from the northern winds, is an uncommon occurrence, but occasional snow flurries have been seen over the recent years especially in the hilly districts, more substantial in the northern hinterland. More recently, light snowfalls occurred on 9 February 2015, 6 January 2017 and 5 January 2019, but the last heavy snowfall dates back to 17 December 1988.

Demographics

In January 2015, there were 315,601 people residing in Catania, of whom 47.2% were male and 52.8% were female. Minors (people under age 18) totalled 20.50 percent of the population compared to pensioners who number 18.87 percent. This compares with the Italian average of 18.06 percent (minors) and 19.94 percent (pensioners).

The average age of Catania residents is 41 compared to the Italian average of 42. In the five years between 2002 and 2007, the population of Catania declined by 3.35 percent, while Italy as a whole grew by 3.85 percent. The reason for this population decline in the comune di Catania is mainly due to a large segment of the population leaving the city centre to go to live in the uptown residential areas of the comuni of the Metropolitan area. As a result of this, while the population in the comune di Catania declines, the population of the hinterland comuni increases making the overall population of the Metropolitan area increase.

The current birth rate of Catania is 10.07 births per 1,000 inhabitants compared to the Italian average of 9.45 births. , 98.03% of the population was Italian. The largest immigrant groups come from Sub-Saharan Africa: 0.69%, South Asia: 0.46%, and from other European countries (particularly from Ukraine and Poland): 0.33%. There is currently a small community of Samaritans from Israel.

History

Foundation
Around 729 BC, the ancient village of Katane was occupied by Chalcidian Greek settlers from nearby Naxos along the coast. It became the Chalcidian colony of Katánē under a leader named Euarchos (Euarchus) and the native population was rapidly Hellenised.

Thucydides states that it came into existence slightly later than Leontini (modern Lentini), which he claims was five years after Syracuse, or 730 BC.

The settlement's acropolis was on the hill of Monte Vergine, a defensible hill immediately west of the current city centre. The port of Catania appears to have been much frequented in ancient time and was the chief place of export for the corn of the rich neighbouring plains.

Greek Catania

Catania was associated with the ancient legend of Amphinomos and Anapias, who, on occasion of a great eruption of Etna, abandoned all their property and carried off their aged parents on their shoulders. The stream of lava itself was said to have parted, and flowed aside so as not to harm them. Statues were erected to their honour, and the place of their burial was known as the Campus Piorum; the Catanaeans even introduced the figures of the youths on their coins, and the legend became a favorite subject of allusion and declamation among the Latin poets, of whom the younger Lucilius and Claudian have dwelt upon it at considerable length.

The Greek polis of Catania appears to have been a local center of learning. The philosopher and legislator Charondas (late 6th c. BC), born in Catania, putatively wrote program of laws used here and in other Chalcidic cities, both in Sicily and through Magna Graecia. suggesting a link between Catania and other cities during this time. The poets Ibycus and Stesichorus (–555 BC) lived in Catania. The latter putatively was buried in a magnificent sepulchre outside one of the gates, therefore named Porta Stesichoreia. Xenophanes (-475 BC), one of the founders of the Eleatic school of philosophy, also spent the latter years of his life in the city. The first introduction of dancing to accompany the flute was also ascribed to Andron, a citizen of Catania.

Catania appears to have remained independent until the conquest by the despot Hieron of Syracuse; in 476 BC, he expelled all the original inhabitants of Catania and replaced them with his subjects from the town of Leontini – said to have numbered no less than 10,000, consisting partly of Syracusans and Peloponnesians. For this he was celebrated by Pindar, and after his death he received heroic honours from the citizens of his new colony.

A few years after the death of Hieron and the expulsion of Thrasybulus of Syracuse, the Syracusans combined with Ducetius, king of the Sicels, to expel the newly settled inhabitants of Catania, who went on to settle in the fortress of Inessa (to which they gave the name Aetna). The old Chalcidic citizens returned to the city in 461 BC.

The period that followed appears to have been one of great prosperity for Catania, as well as for the Sicilian cities in general.

In 415 BC, Catania became involved with the expedition to Sicily pursued by the Athenians to punish Syracuse. Initially the Catanaeans refused to allow the Athenians into their city, but after the latter had forced an entrance, the Athenian leader Alcibiades made a famous speech in front of the assembly. Catania became an ally, and the headquarters of the Athenian army for the first year of the expedition, and a base of their subsequent operations against Syracuse. After the defeat of the Athenians, Catania was again threatened by Syracuse. In 403 BC, Dionysius I of Syracuse plundered the city, sold its citizens as slaves, and repopulated the town with Campanian mercenaries. However, the Carthaginians would take possession of Catania under Himilco and Mago, after the nearby great naval Battle of Catana (397 BC) where they defeated Leptines of Syracuse, and in 396 BC forcing the local Campanian mercenaries to relocate to Aetna.

Calippus, the assassin of Dion of Syracuse, held Catania for a time (Plut. Dion. 58); and when Timoleon landed in Sicily in 344 BC Catania was subject to the despot Mamercus who at first joined the Corinthian leader, but afterwards abandoned this allegiance for that of the Carthaginians. As a consequence he was attacked and expelled by Timoleon in 338 BC.

Catania was now restored to a fragile independence; changing sides during the wars starting in 311 BC of Agathocles of Syracuse with the Carthaginians. When Pyrrhus landed in Sicily in 278 BC, Catania was the first to open its gates to him, and welcomed him with great splendor.

Roman rule

During the First Punic War, Catania was one of the first cities of Sicily to submit to the Roman Republic after their first successes in 263 BC when it was taken by Valerius Messalla. A sundial was part of the booty which was placed in the Comitium in Rome. Since then the city became a civitas decumana i.e. was subject to the payment of a tenth of its agricultural income as a tax to Rome. The conqueror of Syracuse, Marcus Claudius Marcellus, built a gymnasium here.

It appears to have continued afterwards to maintain its friendly relations with Rome and though it did not enjoy the advantages of a confederate city (foederata civitas), like its neighbours Tauromenium (modern Taormina) and Messana (modern Messina), it rose to a position of great prosperity under the Roman rule.

Around 135 BC during the First Servile War, it was conquered by rebel slaves.

One of the most serious eruptions of Mount Etna happened in 121 BC, when a great part of Catania was overwhelmed by streams of lava, and the hot ashes fell in such quantities in the city itself, as to break in the roofs of the houses. Catana was in consequence exempted, for 10 years, from its usual contributions to the Roman state. The greater part of the broad tract of plain to the southwest of Catana (now called the Piana di Catania, a district of great fertility), appears to have belonged, in ancient times, to Leontini or Centuripa (modern Centuripe), but that portion of it between Catana itself and the mouth of the Symaethus was annexed to Catana and must have furnished abundant supplies of grain.

Cicero repeatedly mentions it as, in his time, a wealthy and flourishing city; it retained its ancient municipal institutions, its chief magistrate bearing the title of Proagorus; and appears to have been one of the principal ports of Sicily for the export of corn.

In the Sicilian revolt from 44 BC Sextus Pompeius selected Sicily as his base and Catania gave in to Sextus' revolt and joined his forces. Sextus amassed a formidable army and a large fleet of warships at his base at Messana, with many slaves joining from the villas of patricians. After the victory of Augustus in 36 BC much of the vast farmland in Sicily was either ruined or left empty, and much of this land was taken and distributed to members of the legions which had fought there. Catania suffered severely from the ravages but was afterwards one of the cities raised to the status of colony by Augustus which restored its prosperity through the settlement of veterans, so that in Strabo's time it was one of the few cities in the island that was flourishing.

Another revolt led by the gladiator Selurus in 35 BC created mayhem for a while.

The Roman aqueduct of Catania was the longest in Roman Sicily at 24 km length starting from the springs of Santa Maria di Licodia.

It retained its colonial rank, as well as its prosperity, throughout the period of the Roman Empire; so that in the 4th century Ausonius in his Ordo Nobilium Urbium, notices Catania and Syracuse alone among the cities of Sicily.

Middle Ages

Catania was sacked by the Vandals of Gaiseric in 440–441. After a period under the Ostrogoths, it was reconquered in 535 by the Eastern Roman Empire, under which (aside from a short period in 550–555) it remained until the 9th century. It was the seat of the Byzantine governor of the island.

Catania was under an Islamic emirate for two centuries, after which it fell to the Normans of Roger I of Sicily. Subsequently, the city was ruled by a bishop-count (1072). In 1194–1197 the city was sacked by German soldiers during after the conquest of the island by emperor Henry VI. In 1232 it rebelled to the former's son, Frederick II, who later built a massive castle, Castello Ursino and also made Catania a royal city, ending the dominance of the bishops. Catania was one of the main centers of the Sicilian Vespers revolt (1282) against the House of Anjou, and was the seat of the incoronation of the new Aragonese king of Sicily, Peter I. In the 14th century it gained importance as it was chosen by the Aragonese as a Parliament and Royal seat. Here, in 1347, it was signed the treaty of peace that ended the long War of the Vesper between Aragonese and Angevines. Catania lost its capital role when, in the early 15th century, Sicily was turned into a member of the Crown of Aragon, and kept its autonomy and original privileges specially during the period from 1282 to 1410.

In 1434 King Alfonso V founded here the Siciliae Studium Generale, the oldest university in the island.

Early modern times

With the unification of Castile and Aragon (early 16th century), Sicily became part of the Spanish Empire. It rebelled against the foreign government in 1516 and 1647.

In 1669 the city's surroundings suffered great material damage from the 1669 Etna eruption. The city itself was largely saved by its walls that diverted most of the lava into the port. Afterwards, in 1693 the city was nearly completely destroyed by a heavy 1693 Sicily earthquake and its aftershocks. The city was then rebuilt in the Baroque architecture that nowadays characterizes it.

Unified Italy
Catania was one of the vanguards of the movement for Sicilian autonomy in the early 19th century.

In 1860 Giuseppe Garibaldi's expedition of the Thousand conquered Sicily for Piedmont from the Kingdom of the Two Sicilies. Since the following year Catania was part of the newly unified Italy, whose history it shares since then.

 During World War II, Catania was heavily bombed by the Allied air forces, owing to the presence of two of the main Axis airfields in Sicily (Gerbini and Fontanarossa) and for its strategically important port and marshalling yard. Altogether, the city suffered eighty-seven air raids. The heaviest took place in the spring and summer of 1943, before and during the Allied invasion of Sicily; they caused heavy damage to the city (among others, twenty-eight churches and most historic palaces suffered damage), killed 750 inhabitants and prompted most of the population to flee to the countryside. After heavy fighting across eastern Sicily, Catania was eventually captured by the British 8th Army on 5 August 1943.

After the conflict, and the constitution of the Italian Republic (1946), Catania attempted to catch up with the economic and social development of Italy's richer northern regions. The problems faced in Catania were emblematic of those faced by other towns in the Mezzogiorno, namely a heavy gap in industrial development and infrastructures, and the threat of the mafia. This notwithstanding, during the 1960s (and partly during the 1990s) Catania enjoyed development and a period of economic, social, and cultural success. In the first decade of the 21st century, Catania's economic and social development somewhat faltered and the city is again facing economic and social stagnation. This was aggravated by the economic crisis left by the Forza Italia administration of mayor Scapagnini in 2008.

Administrative divisions

Metropolitan City

The Metropolitan City of Catania was established in 2015 and replaced the former Province of Catania. It includes the city proper and 57 comuni (municipalities). The population of the Metropolitan City is 1,107,702.

Metropolitan area
The Metropolitan area of Catania includes the comune of Catania (311,584 inhabitants) and 26 surrounding comuni forming an urban belt (498,650 inhabitants). The total population of the Metropolitan area of Catania is therefore 810,234. The comuni of the Metropolitan area are:

 Aci Bonaccorsi
 Aci Castello
 Aci Catena
 Aci Sant'Antonio
 Acireale
 Belpasso
 Biancavilla
 Camporotondo Etneo
 Catania
 Gravina di Catania
 Mascalucia
 Misterbianco
 Motta Sant'Anastasia
 Nicolosi
 Paternò
 Pedara
 Ragalna
 San Giovanni la Punta
 San Gregorio di Catania
 San Pietro Clarenza
 Sant'Agata li Battiati
 Santa Maria di Licodia
 Santa Venerina
 Trecastagni
 Tremestieri Etneo
 Valverde
 Viagrande
 Zafferana Etnea

These comuni form a system with the centre of Catania sharing its economical and social life and creating an organic urban texture.

City proper
The city of Catania proper (comune di Catania) is divided in six administrative areas called circoscrizioni. The current administrative setup was established in 2013, modifying previous setups dating back to 1971, 1978 and 1995.

The six areas are:

Main sights

The symbol of the city is u Liotru, or the Fontana dell'Elefante, assembled in 1736 by Giovanni Battista Vaccarini. It portrays an ancient lavic stone elephant and is topped by an Egyptian obelisk from Syene. Legend has it that Vaccarini's original elephant was neuter, which the men of Catania took as an insult to their virility. To appease them, Vaccarini appropriately appended elephantine testicles to the original statue.

The Sicilian name u Liotru is a phonetic change of Heliodorus, a nobleman who, after trying without success to become bishop of the city, became a sorcerer and was therefore condemned to the stake. Legend has it that Heliodorus himself was the sculptor of the lava elephant and that he used to magically ride it in his fantastic travels from Catania to Constantinople. Another legend has it that Heliodorus was able to transform himself into an elephant.

The presence of an elephant in the history of Catania is surely connected to both zooarcheology and popular creeds. In fact, the prehistoric fauna of Sicily from the Upper Paleolithic, included dwarf elephants. Paleontologist Othenio Abel suggested that the presence of dwarf elephants in Sicily may be the origin of the legend of the Cyclops. Ancient Greeks, after finding the skulls of dwarf elephants, about twice the size of a human skull, with a large central nasal cavity (mistaken for a large single eye socket) supposed that they were skulls of giants with a single eye.

The Catanian Museum of Mineralogy, Paleontology and Vulcanology holds the integral unburied skeleton of an Elephas falconeri in an excellent state of conservation. The first inhabitants of Etna molded such lavic artifacts to idolize the mythical proboscidian.

Classical buildings
The city has been buried by lava a total of seventeen times in recorded history, and in layers under the present-day city are the Roman city that preceded it, and the Greek city before that. Many of the ancient monuments of the Roman city have been destroyed by these numerous incidents. Currently, different ancient remains can be seen and visited in the city centre, as part of an archaeological park (Parco Archeologico Greco-Romano di Catania).

Ancient edifices include:

Greek-Roman Theatre of Catania and Odeon (2nd to 3rd century CE)
Amphitheatre of Catania
Greek Acropolis of Montevergine
Roman Forum
Christian basilicas, hypogea, burial monuments, and catacombs
Thermae
Achillean Baths
Terme dell'Indirizzo
Terme di Santa Maria Odigitria
Terme della Rotonda
Baths of the Four Quoins
Terme di Palazzo Asmundo
Terme di Casa Gagliano
Terme della Chiesa di Sant'Antonio Abate

Baroque and historical churches

The Baroque city centre of Catania is a UNESCO World Heritage Site.

Catania Cathedral (1070–1093, rebuilt after 1693 earthquake) built atop Terme Achilliana
Sant'Agata, Badia di (1620), church and monastery
Sant'Agata la Vetere (254) church
Sant'Agata al Borgo,  built 1669, destroyed 1693, rebuilt 1709). The "Borough" (il Borgo) is an inner district of Catania.
Sant'Agata al Carcere or Santo Carcere (1760). Church built above jail (carcere) where Ste Agatha was allegedly imprisoned during her martyrdom.
Sant'Agata on the Lavic Runnels
Sant'Anna church
San Antonio Abate
San Benedetto (1704–1713) church and adjacent Badìa Grande e Piccola del Chiostro delle Monache Benedettine
San Biagio, church formerly called Sant'Agata alla Fornace (1098, rebuilt 1700)
Basilica della Collegiata, Sicilian Baroque façade by Stefano Ittar
San Camillo ai Crociferi, church
Santa Caterina al Rinazzo church
Santa Chiara (1563) church, and former convent of Poor Clares
San Domenico or Santa Maria la Grande  (1224), church and convent
Sant'Euplio, ruins of church
San Filippo Neri
San Francesco d'Assisi all'Immacolata (1329), Franciscan church with tomb of its founding patron, Queen Eleanor of Sicily
San Francesco Borgia church and adjacent former Jesuit college
San Francesco di Paola
San Gaetano alle Grotte (260) church
San Gaetano alla Marina
San Giovanni Battista, in the suburb of San Giovanni di Galermo
San Giuliano church and convent
San Giuseppe al Duomo church
San Giuseppe al Transito church
Madonna del Carmine (1729) Basilica church and sanctuary
Santa Maria di Gesu church (1465, restored in 1706)
Santa Maria della Guardia church
Santa Maria dell'Indirizzo (1730) church
Santa Maria della Mercede church
Santa Maria della Mercede church
Santa Maria di Ogninella
Santa Maria della Purità or della Visitazione (1775), church and conservatory
Santa Maria della Providenza al Borgo, church
Santa Maria della Rotonda
Santa Maria del Soccorso or Santa Maria della Palma church
Santa Maria dell'Aiuto parish church and sanctuary
Santa Maria dell'Itria or Odigitria, church
Santa Marta
San Martino dei Bianchi church
San Michele the Lesser
San Michele Arcangelo ai Minoriti  (Franciscan) church, a second Minoritelli church is nearby
San Nicolò l'Arena (1687), unfinished basilica church and extensive Benedictine Monastery of San Nicolò l'Arena (1558) 
San Nicolas al Borgo
San Placido (1769) church
Madonna delle Grazie Chapel
Santa Rita in Sant'Agostino church
San Sebastiano (1313)
Santa Teresa, Carmelitan church and convent
Santissima Trinità, church
Santa Ursula
Chiesa delle Verginelle di Sant'Agata
San Vincenzo de' Paoli, church
Santissimo Sacramento al Borgo church
Chapel of the Blind's Housing (Ospizio dei Ciechi)
Santissimo Sacramento al Duomo, church
Church of the Holy Child
Our Lady of Providence
San Berillo in Santa Maria degli Ammalati, church
Our Lady of the Poor
Little Saviour's Byzantine Chapel
Church of the Santissimo Sacramento Ritrovato (1796).
Sanctuary of Our Lady of Ognina (1308). Ognina is the maritime quarter and the main fishing port in Catania. Many bareboats and sailing vessels gather here all year round. In its close vicinity is a cylindrical tower known as Saint Mary's Tower (Torre Santa Maria), which was restructured in the 16th century to prevent the frequent plundering by the Saracen pirates. The church is the result of the gradual modification of the Greek Temple Athena Longatis or Parthenos Longatis that existed on the steep reef. This cult was imported from a Boeotian region of Greece called Longas from where the first Hellenic settlers of this borough probably came. After the earthquake of 1693 it was rebuilt in the same place, but with a different orientation.
Our Lady of Montserrat (1755)
Saint Mary of La Salette
Our Lady of Concordia
Our Lady of Consolation
Santissimo Crocifisso Maiorana church
Crucifix of Miracles
Crucifix of Good Death
Our Lady of La Mecca
Most Holy Redeemer
Divina Maternità church
Chapel of Mary Auxiliatrix
Chapel of the Sacred Heart of Jesus church
Sacro Cuore al Fortino (1898) church
Saints George and Denis
Sacred Heart Church of the Capuchins
Saint Christopher
Saints Cosmas and Damian
Saint Vitus
Santi Angeli Custodi church
Santissimo Salvatore church

Other

Ursino Castle, built by emperor Frederick II in the 13th century.
Palazzo degli Elefanti (Palace of the Elephants), designed by Vaccarini, houses the municipality offices.
Biscari Palace
Tezzano Palace
Uzeda Gate
The Medieval Gothic-Catalan Arch of Saint John of Friars (San Giovanni de' Fleres)
Porta Garibaldi, triumphal arch, originally Porta Ferdinandea erected in 1768 to celebrate the wedding of King Ferdinand I and Marie Caroline of Austria
Porta del Fortino ("Redoubt Gate")
Bellini Theater
Sangiorgi Theater
Palazzo Rosa ("Pink Palace")
Negozio Frigeri ("Frigeri Shop", or "Frigeri Palace")
The House of the Mutilateds of War (Casa del Mutilato) built in Fascist-style architecture
Catania War Cemetery, a Commonwealth Graveyard located in the southern country hamlet of Bicocca
Palazzo delle Poste ("Post Office Palace")
Bellini Garden, or Villa Bellini
Catania Botanical Garden
Giardino Pacini (Pacini Garden), or Villa Pacini
Gioeni Park

Economy
 

Catania is the first economic and industrial hub of Sicily. The city is famous for its mainly petrochemical industry, and the extraction of sulphur. In the year 2000, according to Census, Catania was the 14th richest city in Italy, with a GDP of US$6.6 billion (€6.304 billion), which was 0.54% of the Italian GDP, a GDP per capita of US$21,000 (€20,100) and an average GDP per employee of US$69,000 (€66,100).

In the late-19th century and early-20th century, Catania began to be heavily industrialised, with its several factories and chimneys, often being referred to as Southern Italy's "Manchester". The economy of Catania suffered heavily from the bad effects of World War I, and was marked by an economic crisis and recession that culminated in the 1920s. Since then, the city lost its industrial and entrepreneurial importance. In the 1930s, Catania remained a small fishing town with derelict and disused industries. However, after the destruction of World War II, Catania's economy began to re-grow in the late-1950s and early-1960s. The city's economic growth was so rapid and dynamic that it was often nicknamed the "Milan of the South", or in Italian "Milano del Sud". This rapid economic growth prompted a great number of Sicilians living in the more rural areas, or smaller towns such as Enna, Ragusa and Caltanissetta, to move to the city to seek new jobs.

Today, Catania, despite several problems, has one of the most dynamic economies in the whole of Southern Italy. It still has a strong industrial and agricultural sector, and a fast-growing tourist industry, with many international visitors coming to visit the city's main sights and the nearby Etna volcano. It contains the headquarters or important offices of companies such as STMicroelectronics, and also several chemical and pharmaceutical businesses. There have been several new business developments to further boost Catania's economy, including the construction of Etnapolis, a big shopping mall designed by Massimiliano Fuksas, the same architect who designed the FieraMilano industrial fair in Milan, or the Etna Valley, where several high-tech offices are located.

Tourism is a fast-growing industry in Catania. Lately, the administration and private companies have made several investments in the hospitality industry in order to make tourism a competitive sector in the Metropolitan City. Etnaland, a large amusement and water park located in Belpasso, is in the metropolitan area of Catania, 12 kilometers (7 miles) from the city center. It is the largest of its kind in Southern Italy and attracts thousands of tourists, not only from Sicily, but also from the rest of Italy. According to Tripadvisor (2018) it is the third-largest water park in Europe.

The seaport of Catania is linked to the road-rail distribution hub of Bologna. In September 2020 Mercitalia Logistics opened the first full railway route to link the city to Northern Italy. It replaced an older mixed maritime-railway line.

Education

Established in 1434, the University of Catania is the oldest university in Sicily. Its academic nicknames are: Siculorum Gymnasium and Siciliae Studium Generale. It hosts 12 faculties and over 62,000 students; and offers undergraduate and postgraduate programs.

Catania hosts the Scuola superiore di Catania, linked to the University of Catania, aimed at excellence in education; they offer undergraduate and postgraduate programs for teachers.

Catania is home to the prestigious Istituto Musicale Vincenzo Bellini an advanced institute of musical studies (Conservatory) and the Accademia di Belle Arti an advanced institute of artistic studies. Both institutions offer programs of university level for musical and artistic education.

Culture

Opera composer Vincenzo Bellini was born in Palazzo Gravina-Cruyllas in the city center, the palace now houses a museum about him. The Teatro Massimo Vincenzo Bellini, which opened in 1890, presents a variety of works through a season, which run from December to May, including the works of its namesake.

Giovanni Verga was born in Catania in 1840. He became the greatest writer of Verismo, an Italian literary movement akin to Naturalism. His novels portray life among the lower levels of Sicilian society, such as fishermen and stonemasons, and were written in a mixture of both literary language and the local dialect. Francesco Longo Mancini was a painter known for his paintings of nudes, who was born in Catania in 1880.

The city's patron saint is Saint Agatha, who is celebrated with religious pageantry, the Festival of Saint Agatha, on 5 February every year.

The city is the base of the newspaper La Sicilia and of the TV channel Antenna Sicilia, also known as the Sicilia Channel. Several other local television channels and free-press magazines have their headquarters in Catania.

Catania hosts Etna Comics, a successful comic book convention.

The city is home to the Catania Jazz Festival, which typically runs for several winter months with concerts in different locations. In the late 1980s and during the 1990s Catania had an energetic and unique popular music scene. Indie pop and indie rock bands, local radio stations, and dynamic independent music record labels sprung up as a result. As a result, in those years the city experienced a vital and effervescent cultural period. Artists like Carmen Consoli and Mario Venuti, and internationally known indie rock bands like Uzeda came out of this cultural milieu.

Sports

Catania is home to many sports clubs covering a wide range of disciplines. The most famous club is the Calcio Catania football team, followed by approximately half a million supporters. Another club standing out from the rest is Orizzonte Catania, which is the leading women's water polo club in Italy, with 22 National Championship titles (15 in a row from 1992 to 2006), and also in Europe, with 8 European Champions Cup titles.

Catania is the most successful city in team sports in the entire south of Italy (including Sicily and Sardinia), leading (as of January 2023) with 67 National Championships titles, ahead of Naples (60 National Championships titles) and of Bari (29 National Championships titles).

Considering the total number of titles won by Sicilian sports clubs, 67 out of 108 National Championships titles are from Catania, with the capital Palermo following with just 11 National Championships titles.

As for individual sports, 56 athletes from Catania have won world titles, 54 have won European titles and 139 have won national titles.

In the Olympic Games, over the years, Italian athletes from Catania have won a total of 7 gold medals, 8 silver medals, and 4 bronze medals.

National Championships Titles Teams (December 2022)

Champion Cups Titles Teams (December 2022)

Main Sports Facilities

Catania holds the Catania-Etna car competition, organized by the Automobile Club d'Italia. The competition dates back to 1923 and has been taking place on a regular basis (with some gaps) from 1947. Suspended in 2010 due to a serious accident, the 46th edition is planned for the end of June 2021.

From 1960 to 2011 Catania held the International event named Trofeo Sant'Agata, a road running competition which took place in the streets of the city center, every year on the 3rd of February (the day the Festival of Saint Agatha begins).

The city also hosted a series of International Sports Events: in 1992 Catania hosted the first ever qualification tournament for the Rugby World Cup Sevens, and the associated Etna Cup, which was won by the host Sicily team. In 1994 the city hosted, together with Agrigento and Palermo, the UCI Road World Championships. In 1997 Catania hosted, together with Palermo and Messina, the Universiade. In 2003 the city hosted the Military World Games and in 2011 the Men's EuroHockey Championship III. In 2011 Catania also hosted the World Fencing Championships: Italy came out of this competition as the top winning nation with 11 medals, one won by the local fencer Paolo Pizzo.

Food and cuisine

Food is an important part of Catania's culture and way of life. Local cuisine emphasizes several traits of Sicilian cuisine, whilst developing some of its own character.

Street food is one of the best ways to experience traditional dishes. Arancini are perhaps the city's most iconic: they are stuffed rice balls coated in bread-crumbs and deep fried; in Catania, they are shaped like a cone to remind of Mount Etna. Typical specialties from the city include  (puff pastry with onion, tomato, and prosciutto filling), bolognese (a small pizza topped with tomato, mozzarella, prosciutto, and boiled egg, and covered in puff pastry),  (deep fried dough balls with ricotta or anchovies filling).

During street fairs and religious festivals, street stalls sell  (toasted chickpeas and pumpkin seeds). Horse meat is very traditional and it is sold in shops called  ("roast it and eat it"), which roast the meat in streetside barbecues.

Catania is also famous for its pasticceria (pastries and cakes). In summer there is granita.

Drink kiosks are everywhere in town and serve soft drinks. Traditional soft drinks are made by mixing fruit syrups with soda and other flavors such as anisette.

Local products include blood oranges, pistachios from Bronte, extra-virgin olive oil, cactus fruit, cherries, grapes from Mazzarrone, strawberries from Maletto, mushrooms, honey and wine.

Transport

Catania has a commercial seaport (Catania seaport), an international airport (Catania Fontanarossa), several railway stations (Catania Centrale is the main one) and it is the main node of the Sicilian motorway system.

The motorways serving Catania are the A18 Messina-Catania and the A19 Palermo-Catania; and the prosecution of the A18 going from Catania to Syracuse and to Gela.

In the late 1990s, the first line of an underground railway (Metropolitana di Catania) was built. The last two stations, bringing Catania's underground into the city centre, opened on 20 December 2016. The line is planned to be extended from the satellite city of Paternò to Fontanarossa Airport.

Catania public transport statistics
The average amount of time people spend commuting on public transit in Catania on a weekday is 56 min. 13% of public transit riders ride for more than 2 hours every day. The average amount of time people wait at a stop or station for public transit is 23 min, while 46% of riders wait for over 20 minutes on average every day. The average distance people usually ride in a single trip with public transit is 4.7 km, while 3% travel for over 12 km in a single direction.

Notable residents

Aaron ben Gershon abu al-Rabi, 15th century rabbi
Oriana Bandiera (born 1971), economist and academic
Pippo Baudo (born 1936), TV presenter
Franco Battiato (1945–2021), singer-songwriter, composer, filmmaker
Gianni Bella (born 1947), singer-songwriter
Marcella Bella (born 1952), singer
Vincenzo Bellini (1801–1835), composer
Ornella Bertorotta (born 1967), politician
Alfredo Bonanno (born 1937), anarchist
Vitaliano Brancati (1907–1954), writer
Giuseppa Bolognara Calcagno (1826–1884), freedom fighter of the Risorgimento
Luigi Capuana (1839–1915), writer
Charondas (6th c. BC), jurist
Carmen Consoli (born 1974), singer-songwriter
Angelo d'Arrigo (1961–2006), aviator
Federico De Roberto (1861–1927), writer
Tea Falco (born 1986), actress
Giuseppe Fava (1925–1984), journalist, writer, playwright
Turi Ferro (1921–2001), actor
Rosario Fiorello (1960), comedian, singer, radio and TV presenter
Libero Grassi (1924–1991), businessman
Leo Gullotta (born 1946), actor
Andrea Lo Cicero (born 1976), rugby footballer
Miriam Leone (born 1985), Miss Italia 2008
Ettore Majorana (1905–?), physicist
Nino Martoglio (1870–1921), writer
Massimo Maugeri (born 1968), writer and journalist
Angelo Musco (1872–1937), actor
Tuccio Musumeci (born 1934), actor
Giovanni Pacini (1796–1867), composer
Luca Parmitano (born 1976), astronaut
Ercole Patti (1903–1976), writer and journalist
Goliarda Sapienza (1924–1996), writer
Giuseppe Sciuti (1834–1911), painter
Piermaria Siciliano (born 1974), swimmer
Stefania Spampinato (born 1982), actress
Stesichorus ( – 555 BC), poet
Giovanni Verga (1840–1922), writer

International relations

Consulates
The following countries have a Consulate in Catania: Azerbaijan, Bangladesh, Belgium, Finland, France, United Kingdom, Greece, Malta, the Netherlands, Romania, Senegal, Spain, Sri Lanka, South Africa, Switzerland, Ukraine.

Twin towns – sister cities
Catania is twinned with:

 Grenoble, France, since 1961
 Phoenix, United States, since 2001
 Ottawa, Canada, since 2002
 Oświęcim County, Poland, since 2010
 Oxford, England, UK, since 2012
 Borgo Maggiore, San Marino, since 2015
 Kaliningrad, Russia, since 2017
 Alexandria, Egypt, since 2019

Influence on the planning of Adelaide, Australia
The site of what was to become the major Australian city of Adelaide was surveyed and laid out by Colonel William Light, the first Surveyor-General of South Australia. In 1823, Light had fondly written of Catania: "The two principal streets cross each other at right angles in the square in the direction of north and south and east and west. They are wide and spacious and about a mile [1.6 km] long". This became the basis for his plan of Adelaide.

Notes

References

Sources
 
 
 
 
 
 Ilaria Di Pietra, Catania. Viaggi e viaggiatori nella città del vulcano, Giuseppe Maimone Editore, Catania 2007
 Antonino Recupero, Catania. Città del mediterraneo, (Fotografia di Alfio Garozzo. Prefazione di Andrea Camilleri), Giuseppe Maimone Editore, Catania 2007,

Further reading

External links

 
Coastal towns in Sicily
Mediterranean port cities and towns in Italy
Municipalities of the Metropolitan City of Catania

Ancient cities in Sicily
Ancient Greek archaeological sites in Italy
Cities destroyed by earthquakes
Euboean colonies of Magna Graecia
Roman towns and cities in Italy
Sicilian Baroque
Populated places established in the 8th century BC
8th-century BC establishments in Italy
World Heritage Sites in Italy
Archaeological sites in Sicily